Charles Ignatius Sancho ( – 14 December 1780) was a British abolitionist, writer and composer. Born on a slave ship in the Atlantic, Sancho was sold into slavery in the Spanish colony of New Granada. After his parents died, Sancho's owner took the two-year-old orphan to Britain and gifted him to three Greenwich sisters, where he remained for eighteen years. Unable to bear being a servant to them, Sancho ran away to the Montagu House in  Blackheath where John Montagu, 2nd Duke of Montagu taught him how to read and encouraged Sancho's budding interest in literature. After spending some time as a butler in the household, Sancho left and started his own business as a shopkeeper, while also starting to write and publish various essays, plays and books.

Sancho quickly became involved in the nascent British abolitionist movement, which sought to outlaw both the slave trade and the institution of slavery itself, and he became one of its most devoted supporters. Sancho's status as a male property-owner meant he was legally qualified to vote in a general election, a right he exercised in 1774 and 1780, becoming the first known British African to have voted in Britain. Gaining fame in Britain as "the extraordinary Negro", Sancho became, to British abolitionists, a symbol of the humanity of Africans and the immorality of the slave trade and slavery. Sancho died in 1780, with his The Letters of the Late Ignatius Sancho, an African, edited and published two years after his death, being the first published letter collection by a writer of African descent.

Early life 

Charles Ignatius Sancho was born on a slave ship crossing the Atlantic Ocean, in what was known as the Middle Passage. His mother died not long after arriving in the Spanish colony of New Granada, which formed parts of modern-day Colombia, Ecuador, Panama, and Venezuela. His father reportedly took his own life rather than live as a slave. Sancho's owner took the young orphan, barely two years old, to England and gave him to three unmarried sisters living together in Greenwich, where he lived from 1731 to 1749. The Duke of Montagu, a frequent visitor to the sisters, became impressed by Sancho's intellect, frankness, and amiability. The Duke not only encouraged Sancho to read, but also lent him books from his personal library at Blackheath.

Life in Britain 

Sancho's informal education made his lack of freedom at Greenwich unbearable, and he ran away to Montagu House, Blackheath in 1749. For two years until her death in 1751, Sancho worked as a butler for the Duchess of Montagu at her residence, where he immersed himself in music, poetry, reading, and writing. Upon her death in 1751, Sancho received an annuity of £30 and a year's salary.  On 17 December 1758 he married a West Indian woman, Anne Osborne, becoming a devoted husband and father. They had seven children: Frances Joanna, Ann Alice, Elizabeth Bruce, Jonathan William, Lydia, Katherine Margaret, and William Leach Osborne. Around the time of the birth of their third child, Sancho became a valet to George Montagu, the son-in-law of his previous patron. Sancho remained a valet until 1773.

In 1768, British artist Thomas Gainsborough painted a portrait of Sancho at the same time as the Duchess of Montagu sat for her portrait by Gainsborough as well. By the late 1760s, Sancho had already become well accomplished and was considered by many to be a man of refinement. In 1766, at the height of the debate about slavery, Sancho wrote to Anglo-Irish novelist Laurence Sterne, encouraging the famous writer to lobby for the abolition of the slave trade.

In July 1766, Sancho's letter was received by Sterne shortly after he had finished writing a conversation between his fictional characters, Corporal Trim and his brother Tom in Tristram Shandy, wherein Tom described the mistreatment of an African servant in a sausage shop in Lisbon that he had visited. Sterne's widely publicised 27 July 1766 response to Sancho's letter became an integral part of 18th-century abolitionist literature.

Following the publication of the Sancho-Sterne letters, Sancho became widely known as a man of letters. Sancho, a British subject and voter in Westminster, noted that despite being in the country since the age of two he felt he was "only a lodger, and hardly that." In other writings he describes his life: "Went by water – had a coach home – were gazed at – followed, etc. etc. – but not much abused" (that time). On another occasion, he writes: "They stopped us in the town and most generously insulted us."

Shopkeeper 

In 1774 with help from Montagu, Sancho, suffering from ill health with gout, opened a grocery shop, offering merchandise such as tobacco, sugar and tea, at 19 Charles Street in London's Mayfair, Westminster. These were goods then mostly produced by slaves in the West Indies.

As a shopkeeper Sancho enjoyed more time to socialise, correspond with his many friends, share his enjoyment of literature, and his shop had many visitors. He wrote and published a Theory of Music, though no copy is extant today. In addition, he wrote two plays. As a financially independent male householder living in London, he qualified to vote in the parliamentary elections of 1774 and 1780; he was the first person of African origin known to have voted in Britain. At this time he also wrote letters and in newspapers, under his own name and under the pseudonym "Africanus".

Among his acquaintances were figures such as Thomas Gainsborough, the Shakespearean actor David Garrick, violin virtuoso Felice Giardini, the preacher William Dodd, the sculptor Joseph Nollekens, and the novelist Laurence Sterne. Nollekens gave Sancho a plaster cast of his 1766 marble bust of Sterne. Sancho received many prominent visitors at his shop, including statesman and abolitionist Charles James Fox, who successfully steered a resolution through Parliament pledging it to abolish the slave trade. He oversaw a Foreign Slave Trade Bill in spring 1806 that prohibited British subjects from participating in the trading of slaves with the colonies of Britain's wartime enemies, thus eliminating two-thirds of the slave trade passing through British ports.

Death 

Ignatius Sancho died from the effects of gout on 14 December 1780 and was buried in the churchyard of St Margaret's, Westminster. There is no memorial at the church, as the grave stones (which lie flat) in the churchyard were covered over with grass in 1880 and no inscription was found for him when a record was made of the existing epitaphs. He was the first person of African descent known to be given an obituary in the British press.

Letters of the Late Ignatius Sancho

While his correspondence often included domestic issues, it also commented on the political and literary life in 18th-century Britain. One of his more famous series of letters includes his eye-witness accounts of the Gordon Riots in June 1780. The angry mob passed outside his shop on Charles Street. Beginning as a Protestant protest against parliamentary extension of Roman Catholic enfranchisement it grew into a violent mob of 100,000 looting and burning parts of London.

In 1782 Frances Crewe, a correspondent of Sancho, arranged for 160 of his letters to be published in the form of two volumes entitled The Letters of the Late Ignatius Sancho, an African. The book sold very well, with more than 2,000 subscribing to it. His widow received in royalties more than £500, . Joseph Jekyll provided a memoir of Sancho for the first edition, and four more editions had been issued by 1803.

Sancho's son, William Leach Osborne Sancho, inherited the shop on Charles Street, Mayfair, and transformed it into a printing and book-selling business. In 1803 at this shop he printed a fifth edition of Letters of the Late Ignatius Sancho with Memoirs of His Life by Joseph Jekyll, with a frontispiece engraving by Bartolozzi.

''I am Sir an Affrican – with two ffs – if you please – & proud am I to be of a country that knows no politicians – nor lawyers – nor [word deleted] ... nor thieves of any denomination save Natural....''

Sancho was unusually blunt in his response to a letter from Jack Wingrave, John Wingrave's son. Jack wrote about his negative reaction to people of colour based on his own experience in India during the 1770s. Sancho's response was as such:

I am sorry to observe that the practice of your country (which as a resident I love – and for its freedom – and for the many blessings I enjoy in it – shall ever have my warmest wishes, prayers and blessings); I say it is with reluctance, that I must observe your country's conduct has been uniformly wicked in the East – West-Indies – and even on the coast of Guinea. The grand object of English navigators – indeed of all Christian navigators – is money – money – money – for which I do not pretend to blame them – Commerce was meant by the goodness of the Deity to diffuse the various goods of the earth into every part – to unite mankind in the blessed chains of brotherly love – society – and mutual dependence: the enlightened Christian should diffuse the riches of the Gospel of peace – with the commodities of his respective land – Commerce attended with strict honesty – and with Religion for its companion – would be a blessing to every shore it touched at. In Africa, the poor wretched natives blessed with the most fertile and luxuriant soil – are rendered so much the more miserable for what Providence meant as a blessing: the Christians' abominable traffic for slaves and the horrid cruelty and treachery of the petty Kings encouraged by their Christian customers who carry them strong liquors to enflame their national madness – and powder – and bad fire-arms – to furnish them with the hellish means of killing and kidnapping.

Legacy

 A plaque to the memory of Sancho was unveiled on 15 June 2007, by Nick Raynsford, MP for Greenwich, on the remaining wall of Montagu House on the south-west boundary of Greenwich Park. The plaque was funded by the Friends of Greenwich Park to commemorate the bicentenary of the Abolition of the Slave Trade Act, made law in 1807. A second plaque to his memory is on the Foreign and Commonwealth Office.
 When the City of Westminster commemorated the bicentenary by creating a walking tour of Westminster highlighting events and individuals involved in the campaign to abolish the slave trade, they included 19 Charles Street. This was a collaboration with historian S. I. Martin, the National Gallery, the National Portrait Gallery, London, the Palace of Westminster, Tate Britain, Westminster City Archives, and Westminster City Council.
 Sancho was commemorated on a 2007 postage stamp issued by the Royal Mail in recognition of his work as an abolitionist.
 Sancho features on the list of "100 Great Black Britons".
 The Portrait of an African (oil on canvas 61.8 x 51.5 cm, c. 1757–59; held in the Royal Albert Memorial Museum, Exeter, Devon) is probably of Sancho, although it was previously thought to be of Olaudah Equiano, and is now attributed to Allan Ramsay (1713–1784). A full account of the attribution to Ramsay and identification of Sancho is contained in the article "The Lost African" published in Apollo magazine, August 2006.
 In 2015, a play based on the life of Ignatius Sancho, entitled Sancho: An Act of Remembrance, written and performed by Paterson Joseph, was staged at Oxford and Birmingham in the United Kingdom, and at the Brooklyn Academy of Music in New York. From 4 to 16 June 2018 the play had its London premiere at Wilton's Music Hall. Sancho is also the protagonist and narrator of Joseph’s 2022 novel The Secret Diaries of Charles Ignacius Sancho.
 On 1 October 2020, Google commemorated British Black History Month by honouring Sancho with a Doodle.

See also

 Black British elite, the class that Sancho belonged to
 Joseph Antonio Emidy, perhaps the first black English composer (1775–1835)
 George Bridgetower, virtuoso violinist (1778–1860) 
 Samuel Coleridge-Taylor, the most celebrated black English composer (1875–1912) best known for his trilogy of cantatas The Song of Hiawatha
 List of slaves

Notes

References

Further reading

 Friends of Greenwich Park newsletter. Summer 2007.
 Joseph, Paterson. Sancho: An Act of Remembrance. London: Oberon Books, 2011. Print.
 
Ignatius Sancho, Twelve English Country Dances written by an erstwhile slave (1779), Facs. Set for the harpsichord. (London: Thompson, 2014). Interpreted by V. Webster, illus. D. Durant, research S Petchy and P Cooper. Pbk 97 pp.
 Ignatius Sancho, Dances for a Princess, humbly dedicated (with permission) to the Princess Royal by Her Royal Highnesses Most Obedient Servant Ignatius Sancho, 191 pp; ed. & intro. by S. Petchey (64 pp).  22 dances & facs. of their music and two more pieces. A recording of these dances is available from Green Ginger at https://greengingerband.co.uk. .

External links 

 John Madin, "Abolition: Trading faces", BBC – Devon, 28 October 2014.
 Letters of the Late Ignatius Sancho, An African. In Two Volumes. To Which Are Prefixed, Memoirs of His Life. Vol. I. London: Printed by J. Nichols, 1782.
 Letters of the Late Ignatius Sancho, An African. In Two Volumes. To Which Are Prefixed, Memoirs of His Life. Vol. II. London: Printed by J. Nichols, 1782.
  Brycchan Carey's comprehensive collection of resources for the study of Ignatius Sancho.
 The Music of Ignatius Sancho
 Westminster Council's Abolition of the Slave Trade Commemoration website
 

1729 births
1780 deaths
18th-century British writers
18th-century male musicians
British abolitionists
Black British classical musicians
Black British former slaves
Black British history
Black British musicians
Black British writers
Burials at St Margaret's, Westminster
People from Greenwich
People from Westminster
Place of birth unknown
18th-century British composers